Zoltán Ádám Harcsa (born 20 November 1992) is a Hungarian middleweight boxer who won bronze medals at the 2013 European Championships and 2015 European Games. He competed at the 2012 and 2016 Olympics, but was eliminated in the second-third bout on both occasions. His brother Norbert is also an international boxer.

World Series of Boxing record

References

External links

 
 
 
 
 

1992 births
Living people
Olympic boxers of Hungary
Boxers at the 2012 Summer Olympics
Boxers at the 2016 Summer Olympics
Middleweight boxers
Boxers at the 2010 Summer Youth Olympics
Hungarian male boxers
Boxers at the 2015 European Games
European Games bronze medalists for Hungary
European Games medalists in boxing
Boxers at the 2019 European Games
Boxers from Budapest
21st-century Hungarian people